Hasan Fasāʾī (Mīrzā Ḥasan Khan Fasāʾī Farsi), born in Fasa (Fars Province), 1237 / 1821; died in Shiraz (Fars Province), 12 Rajab 1316 / 26 November 1898; the author of Fars-Nama-ye Naseri.

References
The information in this article is based on that in its Persian equivalent.   
 Idem, “Merchants of Shiraz in the Late 19th Century,” a monograph prepared at the Center for Middle Eastern Studies, Harvard University, 1987. 
 A. Banuazizi and A. Ashraf, “The Urban Elite and Notables of Shiraz in the Late Nineteenth Century,” paper presented at the 11th Annual Meeting of the Middle East Studies Association, New York, November 1977. 
 Fasāʾī, tr. Busse. D. Demorgny, “Les réformes administratives en Perse: Les tribus du Fars,” RMM 22, 1913, pp. 85–150; 23, 1913, pp. 3–108 (based entirely on Fasāʾī’s work).
 D. A. Lane, “Hajjī Mīrzā Ḥasan-i Shīrāzī on the Nomadic Tribes of Fārs in the Fārs-nāmeh-i Nāṣirī,” JRAS, 1923, pp. 209–31.

External links

 The Encyclopædia Iranica

Iranian essayists
People from Fasa
1821 births
1898 deaths
Iranian literary scholars
19th-century Iranian historians
19th-century essayists
People of Qajar Iran